Hans Häußler (October 29, 1931 in Berlin – September 27, 2010) was a German journalist, painter, musician, comedian, director and author of radio plays.

Biography 
Häußler studied at the German Sport University Cologne, founded a political cabaret and worked as a trainer and as a lecturer in social psychiatry and in the penal system. He wrote a great number of radio plays, which he partly also composed. He belonged to the Association of German writers, the NGL (New Society for Literature Berlin) and other organizations.

Häußler was the "inventor" of the German-Polish poets steamer, on which he rode along a year between 1995 and 1999. The Berliner Märchentage (Berlin Fairytale Days) go back to him. He took part in the poetry festival "wortlust" in Lublin in 1997.

Horst Bosetzky wrote an obituary: "A true Berlin he was, his father was a movie-director and actor. I have always seen as an actor: Hans, tall and charismatic, in stature as the broadcast ago a bear of man, a like Emil Jannings, Curd Jürgens, Hans Albers or Heinrich George. Whom he knew well. Also to Heinrich Zille, he reminded me. In addition to which he is lying on the Stahnsdorfer cemetery.“

Works

Radio plays (produced) / selection 
 A.B.M. – Requiem auf einen selbständigen Unternehmer, HR/SFB 1974 71 Minutes (Stereo)
 Abgrund – HR/SFB, 1984, 34 Minutes (Stereo)
 Alte Jakobstraße – SFB, 1968, 32 Minutes (Mono) – Berlin dialect
 Die Anhalterin – SWF, 1984, 24 Minutes (Stereo)
 Dummer August – HR,1974, 90 Minutes (Mono)
 Einbruch – WDR, 1978 (Stereo)
 Glückliche Reise – WDR, 1970 (Stereo), together with Wolfgang Graetz
 Harry K. – SFB, 1973 (Mono)
 Die Hochzeit des Schweinchens – DLR, 1992, 21 Minutes (Stereo)
 Die Hölle heißt, sich nicht mehr zu erinnern – WDR, 1966, (Mono)
 Im Labyrinth – SFB/WDR (Stereo)
 Kann man seine Eltern noch erziehen? – WDR, 1974 (Mono), together with Arthur de Fries
 Die Kunst des Überlebens – SFB, 1971, 38 Minutes (Stereo)
 Mein Mantel ist mein Haus – SFB, 1965, 38 Minutes (Mono)
 Der Mörder klingelt nicht – HR/SWF, 1979, 50 Minutes (Stereo)
 Die Raben vom Kietz – SFB, 1972, 62 Minutes (Mono), together with Wolfgang Wölfer
 Requiem für einen Penner – SFB (Stereo)
 Romantik, schöne Blüte der Angst – WDR, 1980, 54 Minutes (Stereo)
 Rotkäppchen und die Wölfe – WDR, 1973 (Mono)
 Samuel und Samuel oder Wer geht mit auf die Kirmes? – SWF/WDR, 1967, Minutes (Stereo)
 Schmetterlinge fliegen leise wie Schnee – RIAS, 1984, 35 Minutes (Stereo)
 Sinkende Fackel – Sachsenradio, 1991, 42 Minutes (Stereo)
 Spielen der Kinder im Hof verboten – RIAS/HR, 1969, 70 Minutes (Stereo), together with Wolfgang Graetz
 Unter dem Pflaster liegt der weiße Sand – SFB, 1979, 45 Minutes (Stereo), Berlin dialaect
 Wie Jonny nach Afrika kam – WDR, 1990, 43 Minutes (Stereo)
 Ein richtiger Lehrer – SFB, 1979
 Eine kleine Stadt zum Schlafen oder Die schreckliche Provinz – SFB/WDR, 1975 Minutes (Mono), together with Isabella Herskovics
 Überfall am hellichten Tag – WDR, 1967 (Stereo)
 Sinkende Fackel – 24. Oktober 2011, MDR Figaro

MC
 Kann ich nicht, mach ich nicht. Hörspiel zur Berufswahl

Books
 Soziales Training durch Rollenspiel, 1991, mit Artur de Fries, .
 Immer wenn ich einschlafen möchte, geht eine Amsel über den Hof, Berlin, Mariannenpresse, 1983

Radio Play of the Month
 Abgrund, Regie: Christian Gebert (SFB), 1984

References

External links
 Hans Häußler at „Boheme & Bohemians“
 Artwork of Hans Haußler for poets wedding on the poet steamer

German radio writers
20th-century German painters
20th-century German male artists
German male painters
German journalists
20th-century German male writers
1931 births
2010 deaths
Writers from Berlin
20th-century German dramatists and playwrights
German male dramatists and playwrights
German male non-fiction writers